The following units and commanders fought in the Battle of Wilmington (February 11 to 22, 1865) of the American Civil War. The Union order of battle is listed separately.

Abbreviations used

Military rank
 Gen = General
 MG = Major General
 BG = Brigadier General
 Col = Colonel
 Ltc = Lieutenant Colonel
 Maj = Major
 Cpt = Captain
 Lt = 1st Lieutenant

Confederate Department of North Carolina
District of Cape Fear
Gen Braxton Bragg

Post of Sugar Loaf

Fort Anderson

Post of Wilmington
Col George Jackson

Notes

Sources
 Fonvielle, Jr., Chris E. The Wilmington Campaign: Last Rays of Departing Hope. Campbell, California: Savas Publishing Company, 1997. 

American Civil War orders of battle